Rabdion grovesi is a species of snake in the family Colubridae.

Geographic range
R. grovesi is only known from the island of Sulawesi in Indonesia.

References

Reptiles described in 2015
Colubrids
Endemic fauna of Indonesia
Reptiles of Sulawesi